William Smith (born April 26, 1939) is an American former basketball player who played briefly in the National Basketball Association (NBA). Smith was drafted with the first pick in the fifth round of the 1961 NBA Draft by the New York Knicks. He played in nine games for the Knicks in the 1961-62 NBA season and averaged 2.6 points per game, 0.7 assists per game and 1.8 rebounds per game.

References

1939 births
Living people
American men's basketball players
Basketball players from New York (state)
Forwards (basketball)
Guards (basketball)
New York Knicks draft picks
New York Knicks players
Saint Peter's Peacocks men's basketball players